José Guadalupe Pintor Guzmán (born 13 April 1955), better known as Lupe Pintor, is a Mexican former professional boxer who competed from 1974 to 1995. He won the WBC bantamweight title in 1979 after defeating Carlos Zárate Serna, and made eight defenses. In 1985, Pintor defeated Juan Meza to win the WBC super bantamweight title, but lost to Samart Payakaroon in his first defense the following year.

Early life and career
Lupe Pintor was born into a poor, working-class family in Cuajimalpa, just outside Mexico City in 1955 and is alleged to have had an extremely violent relationship with his father, eventually forcing him to run away. He lived for a time on the city streets, learning how to look after himself and began boxing professionally in 1974.

He opened his account with a second-round knockout of Manuel Vázquez and immediately stepped up to ten round bouts, claiming a decision over Francisco Nunez on his next outing. He suffered his first loss three fights later, when he was disqualified against Magarito Lozano, but claimed victory in his next eight bouts, seven by knockout, including wins over notables Juan Díaz, Rocky Mijares and Willie Jespen.

Pintor first boxed future World Bantamweight Champion Alberto Davila on 25 February 1976, losing a decision over ten rounds, then embarked on a winning streak of some twenty-two fights in a row. Amongst the fighters he beat during this period were Gerald Hayes – who later conquered Juan Laporte – and Antonio Becerra, the only man to get the better of Salvador Sánchez as a professional boxer.

He then travelled to Puerto Rico, where he lost a ten-round decision to Leo Cruz – himself a future world champion. Upon returning to Mexico, Pintor lost for the second time in a row, carelessly dropping a decision to journeyman Jose Luis Soto. Another winning streak, comprising five fights in a row, all by way of knockout and he was ready for a shot at the world title.

World Champion
Carlos Zarate was Pintor's stable mate and a fellow Mexican. He was an outstanding champion and continues to be rated one of the very best of all Bantamweights. The records, however, show that Pintor edged a very close and controversial split decision, following a remarkable contest that saw him hit the canvas in round four. But the judges were so at variance when recording their verdict, that (like already stated) the contest remains a matter of controversy today. Naturally, the new World Champion's relationship with Zarate – already strained – took another hit and Zarate retired in disgust.

Pintor was a busy champion and he began his reign by engaging in three non-title bouts, beating Aucencio Melendez by a knockout in the first and avenging his loss to Jose Luis Soto before losing a rematch with Manuel Vázquez by a knockout in six. Then he began to defend his title in earnest, retaining it with a knockout in twelve over Alberto Sandoval in Los Angeles and drawing over fifteen with Eijiro Murata in Tokyo.

His next bout ended tragically. He defended against Johnny Owen of Wales in Los Angeles. Many of the fans present and the authors of The Ring'''s Boxing in The 20th Century, have agreed that the fight should have been stopped during round ten. But it carried on until the close of the twelfth, when Pintor unleashed a savage right-hand, knocking his opponent out cold. Owen failed to regain consciousness, lapsed into a coma and died seven weeks later. This fight was documented in the film Faces of Death II.

Saddened, Pintor – encouraged by Owen's family – resumed his career by avenging his loss to Davila, retaining the title by unanimous decision. He went on to retain the belt against Jose Uziga – again by decision – and Jovito Rengifo, by a knockout in eight. He stopped Hurricane Teru in the fifteenth and final round to close 1981 and began 1982, by retaining the title against Seung-Hoon Lee with an eleventh-round knockout.

Soon after the Lee fight, Pintor vacated his world title and started eyeing the WBC Super Bantamweight crown worn by the great Wilfredo Gómez. Stepping up, he immediately beat former WBA World Bantamweight Champion Jorge Luján and then, on 3 December of that year, he and Gómez met as part of the Carnival of Champions in New Orleans. Showcased on HBO, this duel was subsequently dubbed the division's 'Fight of The Decade' by The Ring'' magazine. But it did not go Pintor's way. Gómez recorded a fourteenth-round knockout and relinquished his own title five months later.

Pintor was inactive throughout 1983. He returned to the ring a year-and-a-half later as a fully-fledged Super Bantamweight defeating Ruben Solorio on 16 February 1984 and busied himself thereafter trying to get another shot at the world title. his perseverance paid off when he was pitted against Juan 'Kid' Meza, the WBC's Super Bantamweight Champion on 18 August 1985. Pintor floored the defending champion three times on the way to collecting a unanimous decision and celebrated his new status as a double world title holder.

His first defense of this new crown did not go to plan. Traveling to Bangkok to meet Samart Payakaroon, Pintor exceeded the division weight limit and was subsequently stripped of his title at the scales.  Payakaroon could still become champion if he defeated Pintor but if Pintor won the title would be declared vacant. Payakaroon pounded Pintor to defeat in five rounds and the ex-champion quit fighting for the next eight years.

Pintor made a comeback of sorts in 1994, but at the comparatively advanced age of thirty-eight, he was long past his best. Winning just twice in seven contests through over the next eighteen months, he was finally convinced that it was time to retire.

Honors
Pintor was named The Ring magazine Comeback of the Year fighter for 1985.

After boxing
Unlike many great champions, Pintor has managed his money well and opened a boxing school in Mexico City. In 2002, he was invited to Merthyr Tydfil by Johnny Owen's family to help unveil a bronze statue commemorating the boxer's life and career.

In 2008, Pintor reunited with Carlos Zarate and joined Juan Laporte as the three former victims of Wilfredo Gómez showed up at a party dedicated to Gómez for his fiftieth birthday, in Puerto Rico.

Pintor, along with Hector Camacho and Hilario Zapata and several non-boxers was voted into the International Boxing Hall of Fame in December 2015 and was inducted in June 2016.

Professional boxing record

See also
List of WBC world champions
List of Mexican boxing world champions

References

Sources
(i) There are few online accounts of Pintor's upbringing. A sensitive description may however, be located here: . (ii) For an in-depth discussion of Pintor's controversial defeat of Carlos Zarate, see: . (iii) A ring report describing the Owen fight can be found here: . (iv) For more on Pintor's relationship with Johnny Owen's family, see: . (v) For a piece on Pintor's return fight with Albert Davila, go to Boxing Insider . (vi) Details of Pintor's ring record can be found at the Boxing Records Archive: .

External links
 

1955 births
Living people
Boxers from Mexico City
World boxing champions
World bantamweight boxing champions
World Boxing Council champions
Mexican male boxers
International Boxing Hall of Fame inductees